Yngern is a lake in Stockholm County, Södermanland, Sweden.  A small part of the lake lies in Södermanland County.

Lakes of Stockholm County
Lakes of Södermanland County